ISO 3166-2:JE is the entry for Jersey in ISO 3166-2, part of the ISO 3166 standard published by the International Organization for Standardization (ISO), which defines codes for the names of the principal subdivisions (e.g., provinces or states) of all countries coded in ISO 3166-1.

Currently no ISO 3166-2 codes are defined in the entry for Jersey.

Jersey, a crown dependency of the United Kingdom, is officially assigned the ISO 3166-1 alpha-2 code  since 2006. Previously it was assigned the ISO 3166-2 code  under the entry for the United Kingdom.

Changes
The following changes to the entry have been announced in newsletters by the ISO 3166/MA since the first publication of ISO 3166-2 in 1998:

See also
 Subdivisions of Jersey

External links
 ISO Online Browsing Platform: JE
 Parishes of Jersey, Statoids.com

2:JE
Geography of Jersey